Ficus catappifolia is a species of plant in the family Moraceae. It is found in Brazil and Venezuela.

References

catappifolia
Least concern plants
Taxonomy articles created by Polbot